James Scales Watrous (August 3, 1908 – 1999) was an American painter, muralist and educator born in Winfield, Kansas. He studied at the University of Wisconsin, where he also taught art history.

Works

Art
Watrous painted The Story of Paul Bunyan, an egg tempera on gesso mural, consisting of nine 6′ tall panels, in 1935 with funds provided by the federal government. The mural is displayed in the Paul Bunyan Room at  Memorial Union, University of Wisconsin–Madison, Madison, Wisconsin

Lumberjack Fight on the Flambeau River, an egg tempera mural, painted in 1938 inside the post office in Park Falls, Wisconsin, commissioned by the Section of Painting and Sculpture.

Publications
 The Craft of Old-Master Drawings. Madison: University of Wisconsin Press, 1957.
 A Century Of American Printmaking: 1880-1980. Madison: University of Wisconsin Press, 1984.
 with Andrew Stevens. American Color Woodcuts: Bounty from the Block, 1890s-1990s: A Century of Color Woodcuts. Madison: Elvehjem Museum of Art, University of Wisconsin-Madison, 1993.

References

External links

 Paul Bunyan murals
 Vilas Hall mural
 Memorial Library mosaic mural
 The Library mural
 Ancient Commerce and Contemporary Commerce mural
 Paul Bunyan, Big Boy of the North Woods, Poses for His Picture - Milwaukee Journal article about the Paul Bunyan murals

1908 births
1999 deaths
People from Winfield, Kansas
University of Wisconsin–Madison alumni
University of Wisconsin–Madison faculty
Modern painters
20th-century American painters
American male painters
American muralists
Artists from Kansas
Artists from Wisconsin
Public Works of Art Project artists
Section of Painting and Sculpture artists
20th-century American male artists